Venna Vallabha Rao is an Indian author, poet, and translator from Hindi to Telugu and vice versa. He is a recipient of the 2017 Sahitya Akademi Award. for his translation work Viraamamerugani Payanam (Restless journey | ) based on Khanabadosh which is an autobiography of Punjabi writer Ajeet Cour.

Early life and career 
Venna Vallabha Rao was born on 9 May 1956 in Gudivada, Andhra Pradesh, to a Telugu family of Venna Hanumantha Rao and Lakshmi Nageswaramma. His father was a farmer, and his mother was a housewife. He completed his schooling in Bethavolu near Gudivada. He completed his graduation with a B.A.degree from ANR College, Gudivada, in 1977. He completed post-graduation and received his Master of Arts (Hindi) degree from Andhra University, Visakhapatnam, in 1979. He received Ph.D. for his thesis on "Bhagwati Charan Verma ke Upanyason mein Vyakti aur Samaj" in 1989.

Dr. Vallabha Rao started his teaching career as a Junior Hindi Lecturer at Saptagiri College in Vijayawada for five years, from 1980 until 1985. Later, he worked as a Hindi Lecturer, Reader, Head of the Department (Hindi), and Vice-Principal at Andhra Loyola College (Autonomous) in Vijayawada for 29 years from 1985 to 2014.

During his tenure at Andhra Loyola College (Autonomous), Dr. Vallabha Rao served as the Program Officer,  National Service Scheme (NSS) for ten years and as the Secretary of the Andhra Loyola College Staff Co-operative Credit Society for ten years. Dr Vallabha Rao has translated 125 poems from Hindi into Telugu, 75 poems from Telugu into Hindi, several radio plays from Telugu into Hindi and radio features from Hindi into Telugu. He had presented over 50 lessons in Hindi on All India Radio, Vijayawada, and given radio talks, too.

Dr. Vallabha Rao attended World Hindi Conferences and World Telugu Writers Conferences. He participated in the 8th World Hindi Conference held in New York City, USA, in July 2007, the 10th World Hindi Conference held in Bhopal, India, in September 2015, and the 11th World Hindi Conference held in Port Louis, Mauritius, in August 2018.

Dr. Vallabha Rao attended the 3rd World Telugu Writers Conference (Telugu: మూడవ ప్రపంచ తెలుగు రచయితల సదస్సు) organized by Krishna District Writers Association held in Vijayawada in February 2015 and also chaired a session on the topic "Telugu Sahitya Vikasam – Anuvaadaala paatra". He also attended the 5th World Telugu Writers Conference (Telugu: ఐదవ ప్రపంచ తెలుగు రచయితల సదస్సు) held in Singapore in November 2016 and presented a paper on the topic "Telugu Rachanalu Hindi Anuvaadalu: Telugu Bhasha parivyapti".

He retired as Head of Department (Hindi) in 2014 and currently resides in Vijayawada, Andhra Pradesh.

Literary works

Telugu 

 Jathiya Pataka Rupasilpi Pingali Venkayya is a book written in Telugu about Indian National Flag designer Pingali Venkayya was published in July 2016.
 Kavitaa Bhaarathi is an anthology of translated poems to Telugu was published in January 2011
 Arigapudi Ramesh Chowdary - Jeevitam, Rachanalu is a book written in Telugu was published in July 2012.
 Viraamamerugani Payanam is a translated autobiography Khanabadosh of Punjabi writer Ajeet Cour to Telugu was published in January 2012.
 Saahitya Vaaradhi is a collection of critical essays in Telugu was published in January 2011.
 Telugu Bhasha, Sanskruti Chaitanya Yatralu written in Telugu by Dr. Venna Vallabha Rao and Dr. Gumma Sambasiva Rao was published in January 2009.
 YLP Intintai Vatudintayai... written in Telugu about Yarlagadda Lakshmi Prasad by Dr. Venna Vallabha Rao on the occasion of Annual Meeting of "Mitrama Swagatam" (Alumni Meeting of ANR College, Gudivada 1971-78 Batches) was published in February 2019.

Hindi 

 Bhagwati Charan Verma ke Upanyason mein Vyakti aur Samaj is Ph.D thesis of Venna Vallabha Rao which earned him the Doctorate degree from Andhra University. The book was published in December 2006.
 Pingali Venkayya is a book written in Hindi about Indian National Flag designer Pingali Venkayya was published in September 2015.
 Chote Kumar is a Hindi translation of Telugu book China babu written by Polavarapu Koteswara Rao was published in May 2010.
 21veen Shatabdee ki Telugu Kavitha is a translation of contemporary Telugu poetry to Hindi was published in November 2013.

Recognition 

 Pondicherry University, Kalapet, Pondicherry has incorporated the book  “21vee Shatabdee ki Telugu Kavitha’’() (Course Code: HIND 577) for M.A.(Hindi) program.
 Balbharati (The Maharashtra State Bureau of Textbook Production and Curriculum Research, Pune) has incorporated 3 articles written by Dr. Vallabha Rao as lessons in curriculum for classes X, XI and XII of Telugu Medium Schools in state of Maharashtra, India.
 Article titled Keerthi Chakra - Jagadish Chand was added to Kumara Bharati (Class X Telugu textbook) as a prose lesson.
 Article titled Saahasa Mahilala Saagarayaanam was added to Yuva Bharati (Class XI Telugu textbook) as a prose lesson.
 Article titled Antariksha Vignananiki Velugubaata - Sriharikota was added to Yuva Bharati (Class XII Telugu textbook) as a prose lesson.
 Dr. Vallabha Rao served as a member of Board of Studies for the following institutions in Andhra Pradesh:
 Ch S.D. St. Theresa's College for Women (Autonomous), Eluru.
 PB Siddhartha College of Arts & Science (Autonomous), Vijayawada (University Nominee)
 Montessori Mahila Kalasala (Autonomous), Vijayawada.
 AG & SG Siddhartha College, Vuyyuru
 Sri Durga Malleswara Siddartha Mahila Kalasala College for Women (Autonomous),Vijayawada
 J.M.J College for Women (Autonomous), Tenali.
 Maris Stella College (Autonomous), Vijayawada (University Nominee)
 P.G. Department of Hindi, Acharya Nagarjuna University, Guntur.
 P.G. Department Of Hindi, Adikavi Nannaya University, Rajahmundry.
 Government Arts College (Autonomous), Rajahmundry.
On the occasion of 75th Anniversary of Indian Independence, Pingali Venkayya was recognized and honored for his contributions for India. Dr. Vallabha Rao being author of the biography of Pingali Venkayya, was interviewed by The New Indian Express newspaper to shed some light on the facts about the freedom fighter.

Awards 

 Hindi translation of Telugu play Nallanivadu received National Award in Annual National Level Competitions of All India Radio in 1986.
 Best Translation Award from Andhra Pradesh Hindi Academy in September 2011.
 Received Sri Boyapati Nageswara Rao and Smt.Subhadra Devi Hindi Prachar Gurupeeth Award from Hindi Mahavidyalaya,Tenali in October 2011.
 Honored with title "Anuvada Sahitya Ratna" from Andhra Arts Academy, Vijayawada in July 2014.
 Translation Prize (Telugu) from Sahitya Akademi in 2017.
 Ugadi Puraskaram received from Andhra Pradesh State Government in 2017.

References 

Telugu writers
Recipients of the Sahitya Akademi Prize for Translation
1956 births
Living people